Bankert is a surname. Notable people with the surname include:

 Adriaen Banckert (1615–1684), Dutch admiral
 Judd Bankert (born 1949), American athlete
 Silvio Bankert (born 1985), German footballer

English-language surnames